Elections to Epping Forest Council were held on 2 May 2002.  The whole council was up for election with boundary changes since the last election in 2000 reducing the number of seats by 1. The council stayed under no overall control.

Abolished wards include Broadway, Debden Green, Greensted and Marden Ash, High Ongar, Roothing Country, and High Beech.

By-elections

Buckhurst Hill East by-election

Results

Broadley Common, Epping Upland & Nazeing

Buckhurst Hill East

Buckhurst Hill West

Chigwell Row

Chigwell Village

Chipping Ongar, Greensted and Marden Ash

Epping Hemnall

Epping Lindsey and Thornwood Common

Grange Hill

Hastingwood, Matching and Sheering Village

High Ongar, Willingale and the Rodings

Lambourne

Loughton Alderton

Loughton Broadway

Loughton Fairmead

Loughton Forest

Loughton Roding

Loughton St. John's

Loughton St. Mary's

Lower Nazeing

Lower Sheering

Moreton and Fyfield

North Weald Bassett

Passingford

Roydon

Shelley

Theydon Bois

Waltham Abbey High Beech

Waltham Abbey Honey Lane

Waltham Abbey North East

Waltham Abbey Paternoster

Waltham Abbey South West

References
2002 Epping Forest election result
Ward results

2002
2002 English local elections
2000s in Essex